Robert Seymour Conway, FBA (1864–1933) was a British classical scholar and comparative philologist.

Born in Stoke Newington, he was the elder brother of Katharine St John Conway. He was Hulme Professor of Latin Literature, at Victoria University, Manchester from 1903 until his retirement in 1929.

In 1929 he stood for parliament at the General Election in the constituency of the Combined English Universities for the Liberal party, finishing as runner-up.

Works

Verner's Law in Italy: an essay in the history of the Indo-European sibilants (1887)
The Italic Dialects, edited with a grammar and glossary. (2 volumes, 1897)
Vergil: an Inaugural Lecture (1903)
Virgil's Messianic Eclogue (1907) with Joseph B. Mayor and W. Warde Fowler 
The Restored Pronunciation of Greek and Latin with Tables and practical Illustrations (1908) with Edward Vernon Arnold
The youth of Vergil: a lecture delivered in the John Rylands Library on 9 December, 1914
Horace as Poet Laureate: an Address on the Power of Poetry (1917)
Livius, Ab urbe condita, libri i-x, edn., Oxford, OCT (1914-1919) (and C.F. Walters)
New studies of a great inheritance, being lectures on the modern worth of some ancient writers (1921)
The Making of Latin: an Introduction to Latin, Greek and English Etymology (1923)
Harvard Lectures on the Vergilian Age (1928)
Poetry and Government: a Study of the Power of Vergil (1928)
 Livius, Ab urbe condita, libri xxi-xxx, edn., Oxford, OCT (1929-1935) (and C.F. Walters & S.K. Johnson)
The Great Writers of Rome (1930)
Makers of Europe, being the James Henry Morgan Lectures in Dickinson College for 1930 (1931)
The Value of the Medicean Codex of Vergil (1931)
The Prae-Italic Dialects of Italy, Part I: The Venetic Inscriptions (1933)
Ancient Italy and Modern Religion, being the Hibbert Lectures for 1932 (1933) 
P. Vergili Maronis - Aeneidos, liber primus (1935)

References

“Robert Seymour Conway,” The Classical Review, Vol. 47, No. 5 (November 1933), pp. 162–163

1864 births
1933 deaths
English classical scholars
Classical philologists
People educated at the City of London School
Classical scholars of the University of Manchester
Scholars of Latin literature
Presidents of the Classical Association